Louis J. Doctor is an e-commerce entrepreneur, and the founder and CEO of Crowd Supply and Velotech. He utilises an approach that has been called "reverse e-commerce".

Doctor is also a managing director at Horizon Partners.

References

Living people
Year of birth missing (living people)
Businesspeople from Oregon